Frederick Fyvie Bruce  (12 October 1910 – 11 September 1990), usually cited as F. F. Bruce, was a Scottish biblical scholar who supported the historical reliability of the New Testament. His first book, New Testament Documents: Are They Reliable? (1943), was voted by the American evangelical periodical Christianity Today in 2006 as one of the top 50 books "which had shaped evangelicals".

Early life
Bruce was born in Elgin, Moray, Scotland, the son of a Christian Brethren (Plymouth Brethren) preacher and educated at the University of Aberdeen, Gonville and Caius College, Cambridge, and the University of Vienna, where he studied with Paul Kretschmer, an Indo-European philologist.

Career
After teaching Greek for several years, first at the University of Edinburgh and then at the University of Leeds, he became head of the Department of Biblical History and Literature at the University of Sheffield in 1947. Aberdeen University bestowed an honorary Doctor of Divinity degree on him in 1957. In 1959 he moved to the Victoria University of Manchester where he became Rylands Professor of Biblical Criticism and Exegesis.  He wrote over 40 books and served as editor of The Evangelical Quarterly and the Palestine Exploration Quarterly. He retired from teaching in 1978.

Bruce was a scholar on the life and ministry of Paul the Apostle and wrote several studies, the best known of which is Paul: Apostle of the Free Spirit (published in the United States as Paul: Apostle of the Heart Set Free). Robert Morgan wrote in The Journal of Theological Studies that its "1,391 footnotes reflect both years of attention to the flow of mainly German scholarly literature and a deep knowledge of older works". However, he claimed that there is "a certain uncontroversial flatness about what we are told of Paul's thought". Thus, Morgan said that the biography serves "to inform the educated general reader and the more conservative student rather than [...] stimulate colleagues or other theologians."

He also wrote commentaries on many biblical books including Habakkuk, the Gospel of John, the Acts of the Apostles, Romans, 1 & 2 Corinthians, Galatians, Ephesians, Colossians, Philemon, 1 & 2 Thessalonians, Philippians, the Epistle to the Hebrews, and the Epistles of John.

Most of Bruce's works were scholarly, but he also wrote many popular works on the Bible. He viewed the New Testament writings as historically reliable and the truth claims of Christianity as hinging on their being so. To Bruce this did not mean that the Bible was always precise, or that this lack of precision could not lead to some confusion. He believed, however, that the passages that were still open to debate were ones that had no substantial bearing on Christian theology and thinking. Bruce's colleague at Manchester, James Barr, considered Bruce a "conservative liberal".

Bruce was a friend and colleague of H.L. Ellison.

Personal views
Bruce was in Christian fellowship at various places during his life, though his primary commitment was to the Open Brethren among whom he grew up. He enjoyed the fellowship and acceptance of this group, though he was very much a maverick in relation to his own personal beliefs. He never accepted a specific brand of dispensationalism usually associated with the Brethren, although he may have held a historic premillennialism akin to George Eldon Ladd

Honours
Bruce was honoured with two scholarly works by his colleagues and former students, one to mark his 60th and the other to mark his 70th birthday. Apostolic History and the Gospel: Biblical and Historical Essays Presented to F. F. Bruce on his 60th Birthday (1970) included contributions from E. M. Blaiklock, E. Earle Ellis, I. Howard Marshall, Bruce M. Metzger, William Barclay, G. E. Ladd, A. R. Millard, Leon Morris, Bo Reicke, and Donald Guthrie. Pauline Studies: Essays Presented to Professor F. F. Bruce on his 70th Birthday (1980) included contributions from Peter T. O'Brien, David Wenham, Ronald E. Clements, and Moisés Silva. C. F. D. Moule and Robert H. Gundry contributed to both volumes.

Bruce was elected a Fellow of the British Academy, and in 1965 served as president of the Society for Old Testament Study, and also as President of the Society for New Testament Study.

Selected writings

Books
  - republished as New Testament Documents: Are They Reliable?
 
 )
 
 
 
 
  - Bruce wrote the Colossians commentary, and Edmund K. Simpson wrote the Ephesians commentary; see the 1984 replacement below entirely by Bruce.
 
 
 
 
 
 
 
 
 
 
  - (published in the US as New Testament Development of Old Testament Themes)
 
 
 
 
 
 
 
  Published in the US as Paul: Apostle of the Heart Set Free. Grand Rapids, MI: Eerdmans 
  - (3rd edition of "The English Bible", 1963)
 
 
  - now known as Jesus and Paul: Places They Knew
 
 
 
 
 
  - now known as Abraham and David: Places They Knew 
  [This is Bruce's new commentary on Ephesians and Philemon along with a revision of his 1957 commentary from the Simpson and Bruce volume above]

Chapters

Journal articles

References

Further reading 
 W. Ward Gasque & Ralph P. Martin (eds). Apostolic History and the Gospel: Biblical and Historical Essays Presented to F. F. Bruce on his 60th Birthday. Exeter: Paternoster; Grand Rapids, MI: William B. Eerdmans, 1970. 
 D. A. Hagner & M. J. Harris (eds). Pauline Studies: Essays Presented to F. F. Bruce. Exeter: Paternoster; Grand Rapids, MI: William B. Eerdmans, 1980. 
 F. F. Bruce. In Retrospect: Remembrance of Things Past. Revised edition. Grand Rapids: Baker, 1993. 
 Tim Grass. F. F. Bruce. A Life. Milton Keynes: Paternoster, 2012.

External links
FF Bruce as a Fellow-Elder by Arnold Pickering
F. F. Bruce Papers at the University of Manchester Library

1910 births
1990 deaths
20th-century evangelicals
Academic journal editors
Academics of the University of Edinburgh
Academics of the University of Leeds
Academics of the University of Sheffield
Academics of the Victoria University of Manchester
Alumni of Gonville and Caius College, Cambridge
Alumni of the University of Aberdeen
Bible commentators
British biblical scholars
British Plymouth Brethren
Christian apologists
Critics of the Christ myth theory
Editors of Christian publications
Fellows of the British Academy
John Rylands Research Institute and Library
New Testament scholars
People from Elgin, Moray
Presidents of the Society for Old Testament Study
Scottish evangelicals
University of Vienna alumni